The 2009 Time Warner Cable Road Race Showcase was the seventh round of the 2009 American Le Mans Series season. It took place at Road America, Elkhart Lake, Wisconsin on August 16, 2009.  David Brabham and Scott Sharp won for Patrón Highcroft Racing, while fellow Acura team Lowe's Fernández Racing won the LMP2 category.  BMW Rahal Letterman Racing won their first race of the season in the GT2 category, while Snow Racing led the ALMS Challenge class.

Report

Qualifying

Qualifying result
Pole position winners in each class are marked in bold.

Race

Race result
Class winners are marked in bold. Cars failing to complete 70% of winner's distance marked as Not Classified (NC).

References

Road Race Showcase
Road America 500
Road Race Showcase